Mir (lit. Peace or World) was a Soviet and later Russian space station, operational in low Earth orbit from 1986 to 2001.
With a mass greater than that of any previous space station, Mir was constructed from 1986 to 1996 with a modular design, the first to be assembled in this way. The station was the largest artificial satellite orbiting the Earth until its deorbit on 21 March 2001, a record now surpassed by the International Space Station (ISS). Mir served as a microgravity research laboratory in which crews conducted experiments in biology, human biology, physics, astronomy, meteorology and spacecraft systems in order to develop technologies required for the permanent occupation of space.

Following the success of the Salyut programme, Mir represented the next stage in the Soviet Union's space station programme. The first module of the station, known as the core module or base block, was launched in 1986, and was followed by six further modules (Kvant-1 (1987), Kvant-2 (1989), Kristall (1990), Spektr (1995), the docking module (1995) and  Priroda (1996)), all launched by Proton rockets (with the exception of the docking module). When complete, the station consisted of seven pressurised modules and several unpressurised components. Power was provided by several solar arrays mounted directly on the modules.

Spacewalks  (Extra-vehicular activities, or EVAs) in support of the operation of the station were major events in the assembly and maintenance of the orbital laboratory. EVAs were performed to install new components onto the station, to repair and replace various experiments, systems and equipment, and to install, monitor and retrieve scientific experiments. The first EVA carried out at Mir was held on 11 April 1987, when EO-2 crewmembers Yury Romanenko and Aleksandr Laveykin assisted in the docking of the Kvant-1 module. The longest EVA was performed on 17 July 1990, when EO-6 crewmembers Anatoly Solovyev and Aleksandr Balandin left the station to repair their spacecraft, Soyuz TM-9, then encountered difficulties shutting the airlock hatch upon their return. The total time for that spacewalk was seven hours and sixteen minutes, close to the absolute limit of their Orlan-DMA spacesuits.

In total, eighty EVAs were conducted around Mir from 1987 to 2000.

 denotes EVAs performed from the core module's docking node.
All other EVAs were performed from the airlock in Kvant-2.
EVAs conducted during different principal expeditions (EO, lit. mission primary) are separated by a wide blue line. Space Shuttle missions (STS) are not separated from the expedition during which they took place.

References

See also
List of spacewalks and moonwalks
List of ISS spacewalks
List of cumulative spacewalk records
List of human spaceflights to Mir
List of Mir Expeditions

Spacewalks
Mir spacewalks